{{Infobox song
| name       = Are You Ready for Freddy
| cover      =
| alt        =
| type       = single
| artist     = the Fat Boys
| album      = Coming Back Hard Again
| released   = March 18, 1988<ref>[ All Meat: No Filler] at allmusic</ref>
| format     =
| recorded   =
| studio     =
| venue      =
| genre      = Rap, horrorcore
| length     = 3:34
| label      = Rhino Entertainment
| writer     = Donald Lamont
| producer   =
| prev_title =
| prev_year  =
| next_title =
| next_year  =
}}
"Are You Ready for Freddy" is a song by American hip hop trio the Fat Boys from their 1988 album Coming Back Hard Again . Portions of the song were rapped by Robert Englund as Freddy Krueger. The song was originally released in 1988 as the theme for A Nightmare on Elm Street 4: The Dream Master''.

In the video, Prince Markie Dee's "Uncle Frederick" has died, and his lawyer (Bert Remsen) meets the group outside the Nightmare on Elm Street house. The lawyer informs Markie that he must spend the night inside Uncle Frederick's home to earn his inheritance, so the group enters, and not long after Freddy Krueger appears and begins to chase the band throughout the house, slashing with his claw while stopping to rap.

Personnel 
Prince Markie Dee - vocals
Kool Rock-Ski - vocals
Buff Love - vocals
Robert Englund - guest vocals (as Freddy Krueger)

References

1988 songs
A Nightmare on Elm Street (franchise) music
Rhino Entertainment singles
Songs about Freddy Krueger
Songs written by Donald D